{{DISPLAYTITLE:Nu1 Lyrae}}

Nu1 Lyrae (ν1 Lyrae) is a  star in the northern constellation of Lyra. Based upon an annual parallax shift of 2.49 mas as seen from Earth, it is located approximately 1,300 light years from the Sun. At that distance, the visual magnitude of the star is diminished by an extinction factor of 0.35 due to interstellar dust. With an apparent visual magnitude of 5.91, the star is barely bright enough to be visible with the naked eye on a dark night.

This is a blue-white hued B-type subgiant star with a stellar classification of B3 IV. It is a suspected variable. The star has nearly seven times the mass of the Sun and, at an estimated age of about 40 million years, is spinning with a projected rotational velocity of 145 km/s. It radiates approximately 1460 times the solar luminosity from its photosphere at an effective temperature of 14,534 K.

Nu1 Lyrae has four faint visual companions, the nearest being a magnitude 13.0 star at an angular separation of 34.1 arc seconds along a position angle of 76°, as of 2009.

References

B-type subgiants
Lyra (constellation)
Lyrae, Nu1
Lyrae, 08
092398
092398
7100
Durchmusterung objects